Us Paar is a 1974 Hindi film directed by Basu Chatterjee and starring Vinod Mehra and Moushumi Chatterjee. It has music by Sachin Dev Burman and lyrics by Yogesh.

Synopsis
Us-Paar is a story about a young guy who comes to his village after completing his studies and falls in love with a girl. Later he learns that the girl who he loves is already engaged to someone else. The story takes a turn when they plans to escape from the girl's fiancé but the guy does not turn up.

Cast
Vinod Mehra as Mohan
Moushumi Chatterjee as Kamli
Padma Khanna as Dhaniya
Jalal Agha as Bhairon
Raja Paranjape as Mohan's grandfather

Soundtrack 
The music of the film is composed  by Sachin Dev Burman and lyrics by Yogesh.

References

External links
 

1974 films
1970s Hindi-language films
Films directed by Basu Chatterjee
Films scored by S. D. Burman